The Village: Achiara's Secret is a 2015 South Korean television series starring Yook Sung-jae and Moon Geun-young. It aired on SBS from 7 October – 3 December 2015 on Wednesdays and Thursdays at 21:55 for 16 episodes.

Plot
Achiara is a quiet, peaceful village with hardly any crime. However, on her first day in the town, English teacher Han So-yoon discovers a buried corpse. As the townspeople speculate on the identity of the dead person and the reason she was killed, rookie policeman Park Woo-jae – who has finally accomplished his dream of becoming a policeman after failing the exam three times – team up with So-yoon to uncover the secrets hidden in the seemingly idyllic town.

Cast

Main characters
Moon Geun-young as Han So-yoon
So-yoon decides to travel back to Korea after discovering a strange letter which points to the village of Achiara after her grandmother's death. Upon her arrival, she starts her search for the sender of the letter and realizes her family has many hidden secrets unbeknownst to her.

Yook Sung-jae as Park Woo-jae
Woo-jae is an enthusiastic police officer whose police post based in the village Achiara. After a period of peace and low crime rates in the village, Woo-jae gets excited when a chain of serial murders occur and tries his utmost to solve the mystery.

Supporting characters
Shin Eun-kyung as Yoon Ji-sook
On Joo-wan as Seo Ki-hyun
Jang Hee-jin as Kim Hye-jin
Park Eun-seok as Nam Gun-woo
Lee Yul-eum as Shin Ga-young
Kim Min-jae as Inspector Han
Jang So-yeon as Kang Joo-hee
Ahn Seo-hyun as Seo Yoo-na
Jung Sung-mo as Seo Chang-kwon
Woo Hyun-joo as Choi Kyung-soon
Choi Won-hong as Ba-woo
Choi Jae-woong as Kang Pil-sung
Ryu Tae-ho as Head of police station
Kim Yong-rim as Chang-kwon's mother
Jung Soo-young as Cha Min-joo
Kim Sun-hwa as Mrs. Hong
Moon Ji-in as Soon-young
Jo Han-chul as Choi Hyung-kil
Park Min-jung as Town Lady
Jung Ae-ri as Ji-sook's mother

Ratings
The blue color indicates lowest rating while  red color  indicates highest rating.

Awards and nominations

International broadcast 
  Malaysia – It aired on ONE TV ASIA between 8 October 2015 to 4 December 2015. Each episode aired within 24 hours after the original South Korean broadcast with a variety of subtitles.
  Singapore – It aired on ONE TV ASIA between 8 October 2015 to 4 December 2015. Each episode aired within 24 hours after the original South Korean broadcast with a variety of subtitles.
  Indonesia – It aired on ONE TV ASIA between 8 October 2015 to 4 December 2015. Each episode aired within 24 hours after the original South Korean broadcast with a variety of subtitles.

Notes 
The broadcast of Ep. 11 scheduled on 11 November 2015, was cancelled due to the baseball match.
The broadcast of Ep. 15 scheduled on 26 November 2015, was cancelled due to the 36th Blue Dragon Film Awards.

References

External links
 
The Village: Achiara's Secret at The Story Works
The Village: Achiara's Secret at RaemongRaein Co. Ltd.

Seoul Broadcasting System television dramas
2015 South Korean television series debuts
2015 South Korean television series endings
Korean-language television shows
South Korean thriller television series
South Korean mystery television series
Television shows written by Do Hyun-jung
Television series by Studio S
Television series by RaemongRaein